Robert Charles Nieman (January 26, 1927 – March 10, 1985) was an American professional baseball player and scout. An outfielder, he spent all or parts of a dozen Major League Baseball seasons with the St. Louis Browns (1951–52), Detroit Tigers (1953–54), Chicago White Sox (1955–56), Baltimore Orioles (1956–59), St. Louis Cardinals (1960–61), Cleveland Indians (1961–62) and San Francisco Giants (1962). He also played one season in Japan for the Chunichi Dragons (1963).

Career

Minor leagues
Nieman was born in Cincinnati. After attending Kent State University, he was signed by his hometown Reds as an amateur free agent in 1948. He spent three full seasons and part of a fourth in the Cincinnati farm system, although he played only 38 games above the Class A level. In June 1951, he was acquired by the unaffiliated Oklahoma City Indians from the Reds' Tulsa Oilers farm team, and he played 109 games for the 1951 Indians and batted .328. (His combined average, his tenure with Tulsa included, of .324 won him the batting title of the Texas League.)

Major leagues
Nieman then was purchased by the Browns and was added to their active roster in September 1951, setting the stage for his dramatic big league debut. On September 14,  at Fenway Park, Nieman hit two home runs in his first two major league at-bats. The blows—a solo home run in the second inning and a two-run shot in the third—were hit off Red Sox left-hander Mickey McDermott. Nieman added a single and drove in three runs on the day, but Boston won the game, 9–6. Nieman became the first player in big league history to hit two homers in his first game. Bert Campaneris (1964), Mark Quinn (1999), J.P. Arencibia (2010) and Trevor Story (2016) are the only others to accomplish the feat. Also, Nieman is one of two players in MLB history to homer in each of his first two big league at bats. Keith McDonald, in 2000, became the other.

Nieman became an everyday outfielder for the Browns, later played regularly for the Tigers and Orioles, and overall he fashioned a 12-year career as a semi-regular outfielder and pinch hitter. In his 1,113-game career he batted .295, with 125 home runs, 544 RBI, 455 runs, 1,018 hits, 180 doubles, 32 triples and 10 stolen bases. He batted over .300 three times, twice as a regular outfielder with more than 400 at bats.

In his final MLB campaign, he collected eight pinch hits to help the Giants win the 1962 National League pennant. In the 1962 World Series, and in his only postseason opportunity and last big-league plate appearance, Nieman pinch hit for Ed Bailey in the seventh inning of Game 4 at Yankee Stadium. He drew a base on balls against left-hander Marshall Bridges and was removed for a pinch runner, Ernie Bowman. Bowman would soon score when Giants' second baseman Chuck Hiller hit the first grand slam home run ever struck by a National League player in World Series history. The Giants won that contest, 7–3, but dropped the series in seven games.

Scout
After retiring from the field, Nieman served as a scout for over two decades, working for the Indians, Dodgers, Athletics, White Sox and Yankees. He died from a heart attack in Corona, California, at 58 years of age.

See also
Home run in first Major League at-bat

References

External links

Retrosheet

1927 births
1985 deaths
American expatriate baseball players in Japan
Baltimore Orioles players
Baseball players from Cincinnati
Charleston Senators players
Chicago White Sox players
Chunichi Dragons players
Cleveland Indians players
Cleveland Indians scouts
Columbia Reds players
Detroit Tigers players
Los Angeles Dodgers scouts
Major League Baseball left fielders
Muncie Reds players
New York Yankees scouts
Oakland Athletics scouts
Oklahoma City Indians players
People from Corona, California
St. Louis Browns players
St. Louis Cardinals players
San Francisco Giants players
Sunbury Reds players
Tulsa Oilers (baseball) players